Detective Sergeant James Martin Gordon "Jim" Smyth  is a Canadian Ontario Provincial Police officer known for his interrogations of Terri-Lynne McClintic, Michael Thomas Rafferty and Russell Williams. Smyth also discovered the remains of Tori Stafford.

Career 
Detective-Sergeant Jim Smyth began his career with the York Regional Police (in Ontario, Canada) in 1988 before joining the Ontario Provincial Police (OPP) in 1997. His interest was working in the Violent Crimes Division.

In 2003, Smyth completed the International Criminal Investigative Analysis Fellowship Understudy Program, resulting in certification as a criminal profiler. In 2006, Jim completed the Canadian Police College Polygraph Examiner's course, resulting in his certification as a forensic polygraph examiner and forensic interviewer.

Smyth's interrogation techniques have earned the attention of other police agencies, law school classrooms, and even the general public.

Many people, such as journalist Michelle Lund, have commented that Smyth's soft-spoken interrogations are now textbook examples. A notable example is Smyth's 9-hour interrogation of Colonel Russell Williams.

In 2007 Smyth began working with the Ontario Provincial Police force's Polygraph Unit, Behavioural Sciences and Analysis Services.

Smyth has also taught forensic interviewing and forensic behavioural science at Toronto's Seneca College.

In December, 2011, it was announced that Smyth was assigned to the Criminal Behavioural Analysis Section of the Ontario Provincial Police and is the Unit Coordinator for the four-member Polygraph Unit.

In 2012, Smyth was promoted as Detective Inspector to the OPP's major Criminal Investigations Branch as a major case manager.

Honours

References

Living people
Ontario Provincial Police officers
Year of birth missing (living people)